Anne Hamilton, 2nd Countess of Ruglen (5 April 1698 – 21 April 1748), was the daughter of John Hamilton, 1st Earl of Ruglen, and his wife Anne. She was born in Cramond, Scotland.

She married William Douglas (c.1696–1731), who inherited the earldom of March in 1705. Shortly before her own death, she remarried, her second husband being Anthony Sawyer, Esq, who held the position of Paymaster to the King's forces in Scotland. There were no children from this second marriage.

Her son from her first marriage, William, born in 1724, inherited the earldom of March from his father in 1731 and the earldom of Ruglen from his mother in 1748, but in 1778 inherited the dukedom of Queensberry from a cousin, Charles Douglas.

References

1698 births
1748 deaths
Earls in the Peerage of Scotland
Anne
18th-century Scottish women
Anne
Hereditary women peers
Daughters of Scottish earls